IOI Mall Puchong, is a shopping mall situated in Puchong, Selangor, Malaysia. It has two buildings, the former named Old Wing and the latter New Wing. It has about 250 shops and the number is still increasing. It also has an outdoor parking lot and a rooftop one in the Old Wing, whereas the New Wing features a basement parking lot. It is located near the newly constructed IOI Puchong Jaya LRT Station.

History

IOI Mall Puchong was opened in 1996. It was built to serve the residents of Puchong which numbers were small back then. The Old Wing of the mall was managed by Jusco, a subsidiary of ÆON, before it was renamed ÆON in March 2012. A new wing expansion opened in 2009. This resulted in new tenants like Padini Concept Store and Brands Outlet.

The mall was constructed with Spanish and Colonial architectural influences. In December 2017, renovation works began at the mall in which parts of the mall were each upgraded to a modern architectural style and all main lighting fixtures were changed to LED lighting. Celebrity Fitness was moved to the second floor in the new wing and Padini and Uniqlo went to the Ground Floor. It also included a new food estreat on the first floor with shops like A&W and Go Noodle House. Parts of the mall have reopened, with full completion opened by the end of 2018. In 2019, the old area of Ampang Superbowl has been turned into a digital hub with Sports Direct and Reka Play Gym. In 2020, the old Factory Outlet Store (F.O.S) became the Hai Di Lao Hotpot.

Events
StarMetro Slam Dunk Competition and the AND1 Streetball Challenge were held in IOI Mall Puchong in June 2015. The slam dunk competition was one of the side show events that added to the thrill of the annual AND1 basketball challenge.

Gintell De’Wise Care Butterfly Massage Chair and Gintell De’Vano S FUNtastic Sofa were introduced in IOI Mall Puchong. Gintell brand ambassadors Datuk Jalaluddin Hassan and Amber Chia were also present at the launch here during Gintell's health fair.

On 9 February 2017, IOI Mall Puchong invited special guests to celebrate Chinese New Year, including 40 underprivileged children from Kampung Broga Semenyih, Kampung Baru Semenyih and Kampung Cempaka. Twenty senior citizens from the Kim Loo Ting Temple were also present to enjoy performances performed by Kun Seng Keng Kuala Lumpur, which includes a lion dance extravaganza, a dragon dance and a prosperity drum performance. The mall also gave away necessities and red packets to the old folks, children's homes and poor families, before treating them to a Chinese New Year spread at the Dynasty Dragon Restaurant that evening.

Flash floods
In February 2013, continuous heavy rain at Pusat Bandar Puchong has resulted in flash floods with water levels rising to as high as 1.5 metres, stretching from IOI mall to Bandar Puteri and had caused massive traffic jams in the area.

In June 2015, the mall was not spared by the flash flood which hit the Damansara-Puchong Highway (LDP) along the IOI Puchong stretch due to heavy rain in Klang Valley.

On 15 November 2016, the mall was yet again victim to another flash flood which triggered a massive jam. The flood last about an hour and subsided at 5pm when the rain eventually stopped.

Public Transport
There is a station linked to the mall which is called IOI Puchong Jaya LRT Station of Sri Petaling Line, plus there is a feeder LRT bus service (T600) originate and terminate in the mall.

See Also 
 IOI City Mall
 IOI Mall Kulai

References 

Shopping malls in Selangor